Jéssica Carolina Aguilera Aguilera (born June 26, 1985 in Somoto, Madriz) is a track and field sprint athlete who competes internationally for Nicaragua.

Olympics
Aguilera represented Nicaragua at the 2008 Summer Olympics in Beijing. She competed at the 100 metres sprint and placed eighth in her heat without advancing to the second round. She ran the distance in a time of 13.15 seconds.

Personal bests
100 m: 13.15 s (wind: -0.9 m/s) –  Beijing, 16 August 2008
400 m hurdles: 62.74 s NR –  Managua, 18 February 2006

Achievements

References

External links

Tilastopaja biography

1985 births
Living people
Nicaraguan female sprinters
Nicaraguan female hurdlers
Olympic athletes of Nicaragua
Athletes (track and field) at the 2008 Summer Olympics
Athletes (track and field) at the 2011 Pan American Games
Pan American Games competitors for Nicaragua
Central American Games gold medalists for Nicaragua
Central American Games medalists in athletics
Central American Games silver medalists for Nicaragua
Central American Games bronze medalists for Nicaragua